Roger Federer was the defending champion but lost in the final 7–6(7–2), 4–6, 6–1 against Davide Sanguinetti.

Seeds
A champion seed is indicated in bold text while text in italics indicates the round in which that seed was eliminated.

  Juan Carlos Ferrero (second round)
  Roger Federer (final)
  Goran Ivanišević (first round)
  Jan-Michael Gambill (first round)
  Younes El Aynaoui (quarterfinals)
  Jiří Novák (first round)
  Greg Rusedski (semifinals)
  Hicham Arazi (second round)

Draw

External links
 2002 Main draw

Milan Indoor
2002 ATP Tour
Milan